Pandan Reservoir (Simplified Chinese: 班丹蓄水池; Malay: Empangan Pandan) is a reservoir located in the West Region of Singapore. Formed by damming the mouth of Sungei Pandan, it is the largest service reservoir in Singapore providing non-potable water to the surrounding industrial areas and in particular, the Jurong Industrial Estate. It is currently managed and maintained by the Public Utilities Board of Singapore.

Facing the reservoir on one side is the town of Pandan Gardens and Teban Gardens along West Coast Road, while the industrial areas of Penjuru Road and Jalan Buroh flank the other faces.

It is also home to the Singapore Rowing Association and Easter Rowing Club boathouse, which has its gate along Jalan Buroh. Pandan Reservoir took the name from the area which it is located at Pandan Estate.

Gallery

See also

List of rivers of Singapore
Rowing (sport)
Water resources of Singapore

References

External links
Public Utilities Board - Local Catchments
Photos of Pandan Reservoir
Singapore Rowing Association / Singapore Amateur Rowing Association

Reservoirs in Singapore
West Region, Singapore